Cynthia R. Nielsen is an American philosopher and Professor of Philosophy at the University of Dallas. She is known for her expertise in the field of hermeneutics (focusing especially on Hans-Georg Gadamer), the philosophy of music, aesthetics, ethics, and social philosophy. Since 2015 she has taught at the University of Dallas. Prior to her appointment at the University of Dallas, she taught at Villanova University as a Catherine of Sienna Fellow in the Ethics Program. Nielsen serves on the executive committee of the North American Society for Philosophical Hermeneutics.

Nielsen's work engages a wide range of theorists, philosophers, and topics. A common thread in her work is a "hermeneutics of the other," an attempt to enter into dialogue with various "others" (racialized and gendered subjects, artworks, jazz improvisations, literary texts, etc.) in order to listen attentively to the other's "voice" and incite a transformative understanding of self, world, and other. Through her integration of Gadamerian hermeneutics, social and critical philosophy, and the philosophy of music, she has developed the notion of hermeneutics as a communal improvisational practice.

Education 
Nielsen earned a Bachelor of Music in Jazz Studies at the University of North Florida, where she studied jazz guitar with renowned jazz guitarist Jack Petersen. She earned her Ph.D. in philosophy at the University of Dallas, where she studied with Professor Philipp W. Rosemann.

Overview of work 
Nielsen's early research (from 2009–2013) focuses primarily on how subjects, on the one hand, are socially constructed, and on the other, actively resist sociopolitical, economic, cultural, and other forces in order to shape their subjectivities. For example, her work on Frederick Douglass and Frantz Fanon analyzes how racialized and colonized subjectivities are constructed and highlights how agents employ various strategies in order to resist, reconfigure, and subvert dehumanizing structures, discourses, and practices. Her work on Foucault and Douglass shows how Douglass was cognizant of the disciplinary power at work in Covey's panoptic gaze.

In light of her background and experience as a jazz musician, Nielsen frequently brings music, and jazz in particular, into conversation with philosophy, discussing not only the philosophical and theoretical aspects of music, but also the ethical and sociopolitical dimensions. Her second book, Interstitial Soundings: Philosophical Reflections on Improvisation, Practice, and Self-Making (2015), which is largely a collection of essays, continues the theme of resistance but is concerned with how social, political, and cultural discourses and practices shape musical subjectivities, musical content, and musical practices.

Because Nielsen's work is interdisciplinary and explores a wide range of cultural, ethical, sociopolitical, and hermeneutical issues, her work has been appropriated by scholars in multiple disciplines including not only philosophy but also sociology, psychology, theology, postcolonial studies, ethnomusicology, critical race theory, literary theory, and political theory. For example, in her review of Nielsen's book, Foucault, Douglass, Fanon, and Scotus in Dialogue, Dr. Renee Harrison, describes Nielsen's work as "a significant interdisciplinary contribution to the fields of philosophy, religion, history, and African American studies."

Her current research (since 2014) concentrates on Hans-Georg Gadamer's hermeneutical philosophy with a special interest in his hermeneutical aesthetics and reflections on the ontology of art as a communicative and communal event.

Selected publications

Books 

Interstitial Soundings. Philosophical Reflections on Improvisation, Practice, and Self-Making, Eugene, OR: Cascade Books, 2015.
Foucault, Douglass, Fanon, and Scotus in Dialogue: On Social Construction and Freedom, New York: Palgrave Macmillan, 2013.

Book chapters 

 "Rehumanizing the Inmate: Wacquant on Race-making, Sequestered Spaces, and the Quest for a 'We' Narrative." In Philosophy Imprisoned. The Love of Wisdom in the Age of Mass Incarceration, edited by Sarah Tyson and Joshua M. Hall. Lexington/Rowman & Littlefield, 2014, pp. 255–271. 
"Strategic Afro-Modernism, Dynamic Hybridity, and Bebop's Socio-Political Significance." In Music and Law. Sociology of Crime, Law, and Deviance, vol. 18, edited by Mathieu Deflem. Bingley UK: Emerald Group Publishing, 2013, pp. 129–148. .

Articles 

"On Poietic Remembering and Forgetting: Hermeneutic Recollection and Diotima's Historico-Hermeneutic Leanings." Symposium: Canadian Journal of Continental Philosophy 22 (2018): 107–134.
"Gadamer and Scholz on Solidarity: Disclosing, Avowing, and Performing Solidaristic Ties with Human and Natural Others." Journal of the British Society for Phenomenology 48 (2017): 240–256.
"Harsh Poetry and Art's Address: Romare Bearden and Hans-Georg Gadamer in Conversation." The Polish Journal of Aesthetics  43 (April 2016): 103–123. DOI:10.19205/43.15.5.
"Gadamer on the Event of Art, the Other, and a Gesture Toward a Gadamerian Approach to Free Jazz." J Journal of Applied Hermeneutics, March 2016.
"Resistance Through Re-Narration: Fanon on De-constructing Racialized Subjectivities." African Identities: Journal of Economics, Culture, and Society 9 (Dec. 2011): 363–385. DOI: 10.1080/14725843.2011.614410. 
"Resistance is Not Futile: Frederick Douglass on Panoptic Plantations and the Un-Making of Docile Bodies and Enslaved Souls." Philosophy and Literature 35 (2011): 251–268. DOI: 10.1353/phl.2011.0018.
"What Has Coltrane to Do With Mozart? The Dynamism and Built-in Flexibility of Music." Expositions 3 (2009): 57–71.

Encyclopedia entries 

 "Racism." In New Catholic Encyclopedia Supplement 2012-13: Ethics and Philosophy, Vol. 4, pp. 1247–1299. Eds. Robert Fastiggi and Joseph Koterski, S. J. Detroit: Gale, 2013.
 "Music." In New Catholic Encyclopedia Supplement 2012-13: Ethics and Philosophy, Vol. 3, pp. 1031–1036. Eds. Robert Fastiggi and Joseph Koterski, S. J. Detroit: Gale, 2013.

References

External links
Cynthia Nielsen at North American Society for Philosophical Hermeneutics
Cynthia Nielsen at Hermeneutical Movements
 Cynthia Nielsen at University of Dallas
 Cynthia Nielsen, Google Scholar Citations
Cynthia Nielsen at Academia.edu
Cynthia Nielsen at PhilPeople
Cynthia Nielsen at The International Institute for Hermeneutics
Cynthia Nielsen, editorial board Journal of Applied Hermeneutics
Syndicate Book Symposium on Nielsen's Foucault, Fanon, Douglass, and Scotus in Dialogue
Frederick Douglass Institute "Inspired Publications"
Frederick Douglass Comparative Biographies, Lib. Guides.

21st-century American philosophers
Hermeneutists
Continental philosophers
Philosophy academics
Gadamer scholars
University of Dallas alumni
University of Dallas faculty
Date of birth missing (living people)
Living people
American women philosophers
Year of birth missing (living people)
21st-century American women